Christian Beck (4 January 1879 in Verviers – 29 February 1916) was a Belgian poet. He was the father of Béatrix Beck.

1879 births
1916 deaths
People from Verviers
Belgian poets in French
Belgian male poets
Walloon movement activists